Jacob Otto Esch (born March 27, 1990) is an American former professional baseball pitcher. He played in Major League Baseball (MLB) for the Miami Marlins and San Diego Padres.

Career

Florida/Miami Marlins
Esch attended Cretin-Derham Hall High School. He then enrolled at the Georgia Institute of Technology, where he played college baseball for the Georgia Tech Yellow Jackets. A pitcher in his freshman year, Esch became a second baseman as a sophomore. The Florida Marlins selected Esch in the 11th round of the 2011 MLB draft as a pitcher. He pitched for the Jamestown Jammers of the Class A-Short Season New York–Penn League after he signed.

In 2012, he pitched for Jamestown and the Greensboro Grasshoppers of the Class A South Atlantic League, In 2013 and 2014, he pitched for the Jupiter Hammerheads of the Class A-Advanced Florida State League. The Marlins added him to their 40-man roster after the 2015 season.

Esch began the 2016 season with the Jacksonville Suns of the Class AA Southern League, and was promoted to the New Orleans Zephyrs of the Class AAA Pacific Coast League. The Marlins promoted Esch to the major leagues on August 31, 2016.

San Diego Padres
The San Diego Padres claimed Esch from the Marlins off of waivers on March 31, 2017. He was designated for assignment by the Padres on June 11  and released the following day. On June 21, 2017, Esch signed a minor league contract with the Padres. He elected free agency on November 6, 2017.

St. Paul Saints
On April 16, 2018, Esch signed with the St. Paul Saints of the independent American Association. He was released on June 23, 2018.

Sioux Falls Canaries
On July 1, 2018, Esch signed with the Sioux Falls Canaries of the American Association.

References

External links

Living people
1990 births
Baseball players from Saint Paul, Minnesota
Major League Baseball pitchers
Miami Marlins players
San Diego Padres players
Georgia Tech Yellow Jackets baseball players
Gulf Coast Marlins players
Jamestown Jammers players
Greensboro Grasshoppers players
Jupiter Hammerheads players
Jacksonville Suns players
New Orleans Zephyrs players
Mesa Solar Sox players
El Paso Chihuahuas players
St. Paul Saints players
Sioux Falls Canaries players
Madison Mallards players
2023 World Baseball Classic players